Clarence Eldridge James, CBE (August 27, 1931 – April 16, 2016) was a Bermudian surgeon and politician. He was a member of the House of Assembly of Bermuda, representing the Pembroke West Central constituency for the former the United Bermuda Party (UBP), for 21 years from 1968 to 1989. He served as the head of several government ministries, including Minister of Transport, Minister of Finance (becoming the first Black Bermudian to lead the Ministry of Finance), and Minister of Health. He then served as Deputy Premier of Bermuda from 1983 to 1989, during the government of Premier John Swan.

James was born in Bermuda in August 1931. He married his wife, Shirley, with whom he had three children: Joanne, Robert, and Charles.

References

1931 births
2016 deaths
Deputy Premiers of Bermuda
Ministers of Transport of Bermuda
Finance Ministers of Bermuda
Ministers of Health of Bermuda
Bermudian surgeons
Commanders of the Order of the British Empire
People from Pembroke Parish